SUCI refers to the Socialist Unity Centre of India, a communist party in India
Suci refers to a Dacian tribe